Angela Cavagna (born 6 June 1966) is an Italian showgirl, model, television personality.

Filmography

Cinema 
 Chiavi in mano, director Mariano Laurenti – 1996

Television 

Trisitors (1988)
Striscia la notizia (1990–1992)
Il TG delle vacanze (1991)
Detto tra noi (1993–1994)
Guida al campionato (1995–1996)
Unomattina (2002)
La Fattoria 3 (2006)

References

External links 

1966 births
Living people
Italian showgirls
Italian stage actresses
20th-century Italian actresses
21st-century Italian actresses
Actresses from Milan